Datuk Sapawi bin Ahmad (born 5 July 1956) is a Malaysian politician. He was the former Member of the Parliament of Malaysia for the Sipitang constituency in Sabah, representing the United Malays National Organisation (UMNO) in the Barisan Nasional coalition from 2008 to May 2018.

Sapawi was elected to Parliament in the 2008 election, replacing the UMNO incumbent Yusof Yaacob in the seat of Sipitang. Before entering federal politics, Sapawi was an Assistant Minister in the Sabah State Government.

Election results

Honours
 :
 Commander of the Order of Kinabalu (P.G.D.K.) - Datuk (1996)

References

External links 
 

Living people
1956 births
People from Sabah
Malaysian people of Malay descent
Members of the Dewan Rakyat
United Malays National Organisation politicians
Malaysian Muslims
National University of Malaysia alumni
Commanders of the Order of Kinabalu